The National Security Council (Japanese: 国家安全保障会議; Hepburn: Kokka anzen hoshō kaigi) is the principal Japanese national security and intelligence forum used by the Prime Minister and senior advisors for coordinating security and defence policies for Japan.

It was formed in 2013 as an initiative for the late former Prime Minister Shinzo Abe to replace the obsolete Security Council.  The council is headed by a member of the National Security Secretariat, a department within the Cabinet Secretariat. The National Security Advisor serves as the Director-General of the Secretariat and is the overall highest authority in the council other than the Prime Minister.

Membership
The National Security Council, as of 2021, consists of nine statutory members; the Prime Minister, the Minister of Finance, Minister for Internal Affairs and Communications, Minister for Foreign Affairs, Minister of Economy, Trade and Industry, Minister of Land, Infrastructure, Transport and Tourism, the Chief Cabinet Secretary, and the Chairman of the National Public Safety Commission. The council is chaired by the Prime Minister and is managed by the Director-General of the National Security Secretariat. Although it is not mandated, the Chief of Staff, Joint Staff, Deputy Chief Cabinet Secretaries, and several Vice-Ministers also attend the council.

History
Abe first attempted to establish an NSC in his first premiership in 2006–07, but the effort stalled in January 2008 when he stepped down from office. The House of Representatives passed a bill to establish the Council on 7 November 2013, and the House of Councillors followed suit on 27 November.

The Council has its own national security advisor to the Prime Minister, and is staffed by around 60 officials from the Foreign and Defense ministries. There are six teams handling various issue areas, each headed by an official equivalent to a ministerial division chief. One of its key functions is a regular conference with the Prime Minister, the Chief Cabinet Secretary, and the Foreign and Defense ministers. The office has hotlines to its American and British counterparts.

Together with the publication of Japan's first National Security Strategy in December 2013, the NSC represents a centralization of Japanese security policy with the Prime Minister. The old Security Council had been beset by bureaucratic inefficiencies and lack of coordination. The National Security Strategy advocates for the creation of an NSC because "the security environment surrounding Japan is further increasing in severity. ... [I]t is necessary for the entire Cabinet to work on the strengthening of foreign affairs and the security system of Japan."

The Council met for the first time on 4 December 2013 to discuss the National Security Strategy and China's Air Defense Identification Zone.

See also
 Article 9 of the Japanese Constitution
 Defence policy of Japan
 Foreign relations of Japan
 Japan Self-Defense Forces

References

Further reading
 
 

Cabinet of Japan
Japan
Shinzo Abe